William Austin Ingram (June 14, 1898 – June 2, 1943) was an American football player and coach.  He served as the head football coach at The College of William & Mary (1922), Indiana University (1923–1925), the United States Naval Academy (1926–1930), and the University of California, Berkeley (1931–1934), compiling a career record of 75–42–9.  Ingram's 1926 Navy team went 9–0–1 and was recognized as a national champion by the Boand System and the Houlgate System.  Ingram was inducted into the College Football Hall of Fame as a coach in 1973. He died in his sleep while serving as a Major in the Marine Corps.

Coaching career
From 1923 to 1925, he guided Indiana to a 10–12–1 record. At Navy he posted a 32–13–4 record. These totals included his 1926 team, which finished with a 9–0–1 record.  He coached at California and won 27 games in four years.

Head coaching record

References

External links
 
 

1898 births
1943 deaths
California Golden Bears football coaches
Indiana Hoosiers football coaches
Navy Midshipmen football coaches
Navy Midshipmen football players
William & Mary Tribe football coaches
College Football Hall of Fame inductees
United States Marine Corps officers
United States Marine Corps personnel of World War II
People from Jeffersonville, Indiana
Coaches of American football from Indiana
Players of American football from Indiana